The Oropouche Formation is a geologic formation in Trinidad and Tobago dating to the Pleistocene. It preserves plant fossils.

See also 
 List of fossiliferous stratigraphic units in Trinidad and Tobago

References

Further reading 
 E. W. Berry. 1925. A Pleistocene flora from the Island of Trinidad. Proceedings of the United States National Museum 66:1-9

Geologic formations of Trinidad and Tobago
Pleistocene Caribbean
Coal formations